Busson is a surname. Notable people with the surname include:

 Arpad Busson (born 1963), French financier
 Bev Busson (born 1951), Canadian senator
 Jack Busson (1910–1989), English golfer
 Laura Busson (born 1978), British executive

See also
Busson, a commune in France